Petrus Johannes "Pieter" Groenewald (born 27 August 1955) is a South African politician. He has been serving as the Leader of the Freedom Front Plus since his election in November 2016. He started his political career by being elected Mayor of Stilfontein in 1988. He relinquished the position in 1989 due to his election to the House of Assembly. Groenewald co-founded the Freedom Front in 1994, and served as a Member of the National Assembly until his election to the North West Provincial Legislature in 1999. He returned to the National Assembly in 2001.

Groenewald's son, Michal, also serves as an MP for the FF+.

Early life
Pieter Groenewald was born in South Africa. He achieved a B.luris degree from the Potchefstroom University for Christian Higher Education. Other degrees that Groenewald has obtained include a Postgraduate Diploma in Communications, a master's degree in Management and Development, and a Doctorate in Politics.

Political career

He was elected Mayor of Stilfontein in 1988. At the South African general election of 1989, Groenewald was elected to the House of Assembly of South Africa for the Stilfontein constituency.

In March 1994, Groenewald co-founded the Freedom Front, a minority rights and pro-Afrikaner nationalism political party. He was elected to the newly-established National Assembly in April of the same year. He served as a Member of Parliament until he was elected to the North West Provincial Legislature in 1999. He served as a North West MPL from 1999 until he returned to the National Assembly in 2001.

Groenewald has held various leadership positions in the Freedom Front Plus, such as Parliamentary Leader and Federal Chairperson from 11 August 2011 until 12 November 2016. He was also the Provincial Leader of the party in the North West from March 1994 to March 2017.

On 12 November 2016, Groenewald was elected Leader of the Freedom Front Plus, succeeding Pieter Mulder, who retired from the position.  Advocate Anton Alberts succeeded Groenewald as Federal Chairperson.

Groenewald led the Freedom Front Plus to achieve its best election result in the 2019 general election. The party increased its vote share to 2.38% of the national vote, earning it ten seats in the National Assembly, its highest representation in the National Assembly since its founding in 1994. Additionally, the party won representation in eight of the nine provincial legislatures and largely improved its showing in the provinces of Gauteng and the North West.

References

External links
 People's Assembly profile
 Dr Petrus Johannes Groenewald – Parliament of South Africa

Living people
People from North West (South African province)
North-West University alumni
Members of the National Assembly of South Africa
Freedom Front Plus politicians
Afrikaner people
1955 births